Tougaloo (TUG-a-lu) is an area in Jackson and in Hinds County, Mississippi. Its ZIP Code, 39174, is assigned to the area encompassing Tougaloo College, which is in Madison County.

The U.S. Postal Service operates the Tougaloo Post Office.

Education
The Tougaloo settlement in Hinds County is within the Jackson Public School District.

The Tougaloo College campus includes housing for faculty, and dependent children living with faculty would be zoned to the Madison County School District. It is zoned to Ann Smith Elementary. Residents are in turn zoned to Highland Elementary School, Olde Town Middle School, and Ridgeland High School.

Notable people
Actress Aunjanue Ellis was raised in Tougaloo.

References

External links
Google Map of Tougaloo, Mississippi 39174

Jackson, Mississippi
Geography of Hinds County, Mississippi
Mississippi placenames of Native American origin